The Madness of Love may refer to:

 The Madness of Love (play); 1855 Spanish historical drama play
 The Madness of Love (film); 1922 American silent drama film